

Listed below are executive orders and presidential proclamations signed by United States President Herbert Hoover. His executive orders are also found on WikiSource.

Executive orders

1929

1930

1931

1932

1933

Presidential proclamations

1929
Proclamation of Holy Cross as a National Monument, proclamation 1877, 11 May 1929

1930

1931

1932

1933

Sources
Herbert Hoover: Proclamations and Executive Orders, March 4, 1929, to March 4, 1933. [Books 1 and 2]

Lists
 Original Table of Contents
 Proclamations 1929 to 1933, Book 2, pages 1463 to 1467
 Executive Orders 1929 to 1933, Book 2, pages 1468 to 1506
 Procs & EOs affected by issuances on both above lists, Book 2, pages 1507 to 1519
 Index, Book 2, pages 1521 to 1566

Text
 Proclamations Nos. 1870 → 2037 1929 to 1933, Book 1, pages 3 to 282
 Executive Orders 1929 to 1933,
 Book 1, EO Nos. 5076 → 5549 pages 285 to 780
 Book 2, EO Nos. 5550 → 6070 pages 781 to 1460

Notes

Executive Actions
 
United States federal policy